Ij Rural District is a rural district (dehestan) in the Central District of Estahban County, Fars Province, Iran. At the 2006 census, its population was 4,248, in 930 families.  The rural district has 20 villages.

References 

Rural Districts of Fars Province
Estahban County